Jang Sun-hyoung (born 16 July 1975) is a Korean former basketball player who competed in the 2000 Summer Olympics.

References

1975 births
Living people
South Korean women's basketball players
Olympic basketball players of South Korea
Basketball players at the 2000 Summer Olympics
Asian Games medalists in basketball
Basketball players at the 1998 Asian Games
Basketball players at the 2002 Asian Games
Asian Games silver medalists for South Korea
Asian Games bronze medalists for South Korea
Medalists at the 1998 Asian Games
Medalists at the 2002 Asian Games